Harold Lee Kime (March 15, 1898 – May 16, 1939) was a pitcher in Major League Baseball. He played for the St. Louis Cardinals.

References

External links

1898 births
1939 deaths
Major League Baseball pitchers
St. Louis Cardinals players
New Haven Indians players
Baseball players from Ohio
People from West Salem, Ohio
Ohio State Buckeyes baseball players
County judges in the United States